Street Heath is a 12.5 hectare (31.0 acre) biological Site of Special Scientific Interest 4 km west of Glastonbury in Somerset, notified in 1966. It next to the Glastonbury Canal and Ham Wall nature reserve. Street Heath has itself been designated as a Local Nature Reserve.

Street Heath is a nature reserve, managed by Somerset Wildlife Trust, which has outstanding examples of communities that were once common on the Somerset Levels. It possesses a vegetation consisting of wet and dry heath, species-rich bog and carr woodland, with transitions between all these habitats. Rare ferns present include marsh fern (Thelypteris palustris) and royal fern (Osmunda regalis). Old peat workings and rhynes have a wetland community which includes bulrush (Typha latifolia), yellow flag iris (pseudacorus), cyperus-like sedge (Carex pseudocyperus) and lesser bur-reed (Sparganium minimum). Insects recorded include 33 species of butterflies, 200 moths and 12 grasshoppers and crickets, with several notable rarities. Birds breeding in the carr woodland include the local willow tit

References 

Sites of Special Scientific Interest in Somerset
Somerset Levels
Sites of Special Scientific Interest notified in 1966
Local Nature Reserves in Somerset